William Blyton, (fl. 1399–1402) of Lincoln and Foxton and Shepreth, Cambridgeshire, was an English politician.

He was a Member (MP) of the Parliament of England for Lincoln 1399 and 1402. He was also Mayor of Lincoln for 1401–02 and  1422–23.

References

14th-century births
15th-century deaths
People from South Cambridgeshire District
Members of the Parliament of England (pre-1707) for Lincoln
Mayors of Lincoln, England
People from Shepreth
English MPs 1399
English MPs 1402